Mont Pèlerin is a mountain of the Swiss Plateau, overlooking Lake Geneva in the canton of Vaud. It lies north of Chardonne, over Vevey, the border with the canton of Fribourg running at the eastern foot of the mountain.

The Vevey–Chardonne–Mont Pèlerin funicular links Vevey and Mont Pèlerin. The Mont Pèlerin TV Tower is located on the wooded summit.

The Mont Pelerin Society was named after the resort, following its inception at a meeting there in 1947.

References

External links
 
 Mont Pèlerin on Hikr

Mountains of Switzerland
Mountains of the canton of Vaud
One-thousanders of Switzerland